The  is a type of traditionally made Japanese sword (nihontō) with an extra long handle, used by the samurai class of feudal Japan.

History

It is possible that nagamaki were first produced during the Heian period (794 to 1185) but there are no known examples dating from before the mid Kamakura period (1192–1333). During the middle of the Muromachi period (1336–1573) the nagamaki reached its peak of usage. It was generally used as a weapon for low-ranking samurai who fought on foot.

The famed warlord Uesugi Kenshin, daimyō of Echigo Province, is said to have had a special guard of retainers armed with nagamaki.

Description
The nagamaki was a long sword with a blade that could be 60 cm or more and a handle of about equal length to the blade.
The blade was single-edged, resembling a naginata blade, but the handle (tsuka) of the nagamaki was not a simple wooden shaft as in the naginata; it was made more like a katana hilt. Even the name "nagamaki" ("long wrapping") is given by the tradition of handle wrapping. The nagamaki's handle was wrapped with leather or silk cords in criss-crossed manner, very similar to that of a katana's. The nagamaki is considered to be evolved from the extremely long ōdachi or nodachi swords that are described in fourteenth century literature and pictorial sources.

The length of blade varies on a nagamaki.  However, the nagasa (blade length) most commonly fits the profile of a tachi or katana blade, which would be a blade of more than 2 shaku (2 Shaku = 60.6 cm, roughly 2 feet) in length.  While nagamaki means "long wrap", there have been specimens found with no wrapping cord at all, which is very much like a long tachi handle.  The tsukamaki (hilt wrap) is of even more importance when applied to the hilt.  The cord helps to improve grip on the hilt and also lends structural integrity to the wooden handle. Nagamaki found without hilt wraps usually had at least metal collars around the hilt where the tang is.

There are no solid rules governing the aspects of the make of the nagamaki.  Unlike wakizashi, tantō, and katana, which have had history of strict measurements regarding the blade length and even the hilt in some cases; the nagamaki varied in blade length, tang length, kissaki style, etc. Nagamaki presumably could have koshirae in a tachi or katana style as well as a nagamaki style, however there are examples of nagamaki with rather long tangs, which could be fitted with a longer staff for a haft and effectively function as a naginata. Araki-ryū nagamaki is a heavy naginata over 3.5 kilograms in weight and 240 cm long.

All traditional Japanese swords are fitted very snugly to their hilts and held in place with a mekugi, a bamboo peg which is fit through a hole in the tang called a mekugi-ana.  This is actually quite a strong mount when done correctly, and allowed for easy dismount of the bare blade for maintenance or inspection. Katana most commonly had one single pin, and nagamaki commonly have been found with two or more to account for the added leverage of a longer handle.

Use
Wielding is very specific; it is held with two hands in a fixed position in the same way a katana is held. Unlike the naginata, the hands do not change when handling the weapon and the right hand was always the closest to the blade. While handling nagamaki fewer sliding actions on the handle are performed than are with the naginata, where the entire length of the shaft is used. The nagamaki is designed for large sweeping and slicing strokes. Traditionally the nagamaki was used as an infantry weapon, frequently used against cavalry.

In fiction
Tatsugiri, signature nagamaki wields by Kuryuu Ango in 2000s Gamaran manga. 
Sir Alonne, a boss encountered in the Dark Souls II DLC campaign Crown of the Iron King, is a samurai-esque character who wields a nagamaki. He will commit seppuku with the nagamaki should the player defeat him under 5 minutes without taking damage.
Lyon, a supporting character in the fifth Suikoden game, wields a nagamaki to protect her charge, the Prince of Falena, who is the protagonist.
In The Lord of the Rings films The Fellowship of the Ring and The Two Towers, the Elves are shown using a curved, single-edged sword very similar to the nagamaki, except for a subtle S-shape.
 In the anime called Tensei Shitara Suraimu Datta Ken, the red-haired warrior Hiiro wields a nagamaki sword.
Corrupted Monk, a boss encountered in the game   Sekiro: Shadows Die Twice  wields a huge nagamaki and performs elaborate swipe and swing attacks on the player.
In   Samurai Shodown   (2019), newcomer Yashamaru Kurama wields a nagamaki; currently the only character in the series to wield one.

Gallery

See also
Swordstaff
Naginata
Japanese sword

Notes

References
Amdur, Ellis (2002). Old School, Essays on Japanese Martial Traditions, Edgework
Friday, Karl F. (2004). Samurai, Warfare and the State in Early Medieval Japan, Routledge 
Knutsen, Roald M. (1963). Japanese Polearms, The Holland Press, London

External links

Nihonto message board forum
Richard Stein Article on the Nagamaki
Swordforum Article on the Nagamaki
 Swordforum Discussion of the Nagamaki

Samurai polearms
Japanese sword types
Samurai swords
Polearms of Japan
Weapons of Japan